Eraring Power Station is a coal-fired power station consisting of four 720 MW Toshiba steam driven turbo-alternators for a combined capacity of 2,880 MW. The station is located near the township of Dora Creek, on the western shore of Lake Macquarie, New South Wales, Australia and is owned and operated by Origin Energy. It is Australia's largest power station. The plant has two smokestacks rising 200 m (656 ft) in height. It is slated for closure by mid-2025.

History and facilities

Construction of the power station began in 1977. The first turbo-alternator was brought online in 1982, with the second and third in 1983, and the fourth in 1984. The generating capacity of each of the four turbines was upgraded from 660 MW to 720 MW between 2011 and 2012. The process of upgrading the control room to a fully digital system was completed in 2005.

Salt water from Lake Macquarie is used for cooling and is supplied through a concrete tunnel which passes under Dora Creek and up to the station via open canal. Reclaimed sewage water from the Dora Creek Waste Water Treatment Works is heavily purified and used to generate steam for the turbines as opposed to using municipal potable water supplies. The salt water helps in the cooling of the superheated steam as well as moderation of the temperature of outlet water to minimise thermal pollution.

The coal comes from five mines in the local area, delivered by conveyor, rail and private road. There is significant coal storage capacity on site. Eraring power station employs the Fabric Filter system of dust collection, in which particulate emissions resulting from coal combustion are captured as opposed to being released into the atmosphere. Some of this material is stored in an area nearby while some is taken and used as a component of road base. From 2009 to 2013 the Eraring power station has been equipped with Dry Bottom Ash Handling Systems (the MAC - Magaldi Ash Cooler) at all four units.

Electricity generated at the station is transmitted through high voltage transmission lines. Turbines 1 and 2 are connected to a 330kV transmission line while turbines 3 and 4 are connected to a 500kV transmission line. It is scheduled to close by 2025.  It will close seven years sooner than expected, owing to its operator's inability to cope with the "influx of renewables."

Fire
At 2.16 am on Friday 28 October 2011 unit 2B generator transformer exploded with the transformer oil catching fire. The oil fire burnt for approximately two days and the estimated repair cost was A$20 million. Fire and Rescue NSW, assisted by the New South Wales Rural Fire Service controlled the initial incident with subsequent investigations by NSW Police, the Office of Environment & Heritage and WorkCover NSW.

Pollution
As of 2017, The power station has had allegations made against it, regarding the exceedance of NSW air pollution standards. The EPA reported Mercury emissions of 1.3 kg, and has begun investigating the alleged under reporting of self collected emission data.

Operations
The generation table uses eljmkt nemlog to obtain generation values for each year. Records date back to 2011.

See also

List of power stations in New South Wales

References

External links 
Eraring Energy page on Eraring

Coal-fired power stations in New South Wales
City of Lake Macquarie
1982 establishments in Australia
Energy infrastructure completed in 1982